Biotherm is a French skin care company owned by L'Oréal under the Luxury Products division. Biotherm was acquired by L'Oréal in 1970.

Biotherm originated from mineral water. In the early 20th century, the French doctor Jos Jullien discovered mineral thermal spring waters under Pyrenees mountain in the southern part of France which contained thermal plankton, supposedly a key to healthy skin and a potent skin rejuvenator. In 1952, intellectual property rights were acquired and he used it in skin care products. Thus, therm in Biotherm comes from thermal plankton, an ingredient found in all Biotherm products. Bio comes from the profession of the founder biologist.

History 

In the years 1940-50, Dr. Jos Jullien, from Joyeuse in Ardeche (France), noticed the presence of a particular substance on the surface of the thermal waters of Molitg-les-Bains. This substance is composed of thermal plankton. With Jeanine Marissal, he worked on the potentials of this substance that could be integrated towards creating a cosmetic formula. Biotherm was born from this work in 1952, under the leadership of Adrien Barthélémy, owner of the Molitg-les-Bains springs. In 1952, Biotherm launched 3 products: La Crème Triple-Usage, Biotherm Cure and Biomains. Biomains, a hand moisturizing cream, is still on the market today. In 1955, 3 years after the creation of Biotherm, The New York Times noticed this new French brand: "Plankton is used as aid an to beauty."

During the 1960s the brand developed several targeted skincare solutions to address specific needs, including its first sun cream and its first "slimming cream". In 1968, Biotherm introduces Bio-Buste Suractive on the market, its first "breast firming cream".

Biotherm was acquired by  L'Oréal in 1970. L'Oréal.

In 1982 French skipper Florence Arthaud starts the Route du Rhum race with her trimaran BIOTHERM II, designed by Xavier Joubert.

In 2006 Stanford University researchers support use of Pure Thermal Plankton in Biotherm formulas

In 2012, Biotherm created Biotherm Water Lover, a charity program to protect the world's water, in association with Sylvia Earle's Mission Blue organization

References 

L'Oréal
L'Oréal brands